Fred Evan McKenzie OAM (1 December 1933 – 18 March 2008) was an Australian trade unionist and politician who served as a Labor Party member of the Legislative Council of Western Australia from 1977 to 1993.

McKenzie was born in Perth. After leaving school, he worked as a plasterer for a period and then joined the Midland Railway Company, later transferring to Western Australian Government Railways. From 1970 to 1977, McKenzie was assistant state secretary of the Australian Railways Union. He entered parliament at the 1977 state election, winning election to the new East Metropolitan Province. That seat was abolished at the 1983 election, and McKenzie transferred to North-East Metropolitan Province, replacing Joe Berinson. After the election, he was made government whip in the Legislative Council, a position which he held until his retirement. At the 1989 election, McKenzie was elected to the new four-member East Metropolitan Region. He served one more four-year term before retiring at the 1993 election. McKenzie was awarded the Order of Australia Medal in 2001, for "service to the community in the Belmont area, particularly through support for aged care and charitable organisations". He died in March 2008, aged 74.

References

1933 births
2008 deaths
Australian Labor Party members of the Parliament of Western Australia
Australian schoolteachers
Australian trade unionists
Members of the Western Australian Legislative Council
Politicians from Perth, Western Australia
Recipients of the Medal of the Order of Australia